The 1892 Georgetown football team represented the Georgetown University during the 1892 college football season.  Georgetown finished the season with a 4–2–1 record.  Tommy Dowd, who also played baseball for the Washington Senators, served as Georgetown's head coach for the second season.  They played home games at Boundary Park, also the home venue for the Senators.

Schedule

References

Georgetown
Georgetown Hoyas football seasons
Georgetown football